James Igohe is a Tanzanian Olympic middle-distance runner. He represented his country in the men's 1500 meters at the 1984 Summer Olympics. His time was a 3:39.62 in the first heat, and a 3:41.57 in the semifinals.
James Igohe was an employee of the Tanzania Immigration department as an Athete. Through his runnings, he secured a scholarship to El Paso Texas University together with other then athletes like Alfredo Shahanga and Zakaria Barie Bura. However, since he went to El Paso Jimmy abondoned his carrier and never returned to Tanzania. He is currently working in NewJearsy at Intellectualy Disabled children as a caretaker

References 

1962 births
Living people
Tanzanian male middle-distance runners
Olympic athletes of Tanzania
Athletes (track and field) at the 1984 Summer Olympics